Mononitrotoluene or nitrotoluene (MNT or NT), is any of three organic compounds with the formula C6H4(CH3)(NO2).  They can be viewed as nitro derivatives of toluene or as methylated derivatives of nitrobenzene.

Mononitrotoluene comes in three isomers, differing by the relative position of the methyl and nitro groups.  All are pale yellow with faint fragrances:
 ortho-nitrotoluene (ONT), o-nitrotoluene, or 2-nitrotoluene. m.p. = -10.4 °C
 meta-nitrotoluene (MNT), m-nitrotoluene, or 3-nitrotoluene.  m.p. = 16 °C
 para-nitrotoluene (PNT), p-nitrotoluene, or 4-nitrotoluene.  m.p. = 44.5 °C

Typical use of nitrotoluene is in production of pigments, antioxidants, agricultural chemicals, and photographic chemicals.

Ortho-mononitrotoluene and para-mononitrotoluene can be also used as detection taggants for explosive detection.

See also
 Toluene
 Dinitrotoluene
 Nitrobenzene
 Trinitrotoluene

References

External links
 CDC - NIOSH Pocket Guide to Chemical Hazards -  m-Nitrotoluene
 CDC - NIOSH Pocket Guide to Chemical Hazards -  o-Nitrotoluene
 CDC - NIOSH Pocket Guide to Chemical Hazards -  p-Nitrotoluene

Explosive chemicals
Explosive detection
Nitrotoluenes